Scars is the fifth studio album by English electronic music duo Basement Jaxx. It was released in September 2009 by record labels XL, Ultra and Interscope. Three singles were released from the album: "Raindrops", "Feelings Gone" and "My Turn".

Content
The track "Twerk" features lyrics adapted from Michael Sembello's song "Maniac".

Buxton recalls their time collaborating with Yoko Ono: "[She] was very cool. We were told she would arrive bang on time and leave exactly when she was supposed to. And she did. She's very disciplined. The weird thing working with her, I thought she'd come in being all Yoko Ono and she came and asked 'What do you want me to say or sing?' Luckily I'd written some surreal poem and said, 'You could read this along to the music.'"

In an interview, Felix Buxton stated that the album Scars were all the things that the band had been through emotionally and physically. Felix told Rolling Stone Australia they named the album after he was mugged for his bicycle in Brixton, London in 2008. He revealed: "I wasn't badly hurt, but it scared me. It's probably one of the scariest moments of my life. Scars are the things that stay with you and that incident definitely gave me one."

Release 

Scars was preceded by the release of two singles from the album: "Raindrops", released on 22 June 2009, and "Feelings Gone", on 8 September.

Scars was released on 21 September 2009 by record labels XL, Ultra and Interscope. One final single was released: "My Turn", on 14 December.

The songs "Raindrops" and "My Turn" were included in the 2010 series of concerts with Metropole Orkest which led to the 2011 album Basement Jaxx vs. Metropole Orkest.

The single, "Saga" featuring Santigold appeared as soundtrack in EA Sports game, 2010 FIFA World Cup South Africa.

 Critical reception 

The album was given a score of 69 out of 100 from Metacritic based on 19 reviews, a much lower score than their first three albums. URB wrote, "if you're wondering what electronic music is missing, look no further: Scars should serve as a reminder (if you needed one) that Basement Jaxx are an essential piece of the puzzle."

David Jeffries of AllMusic wrote: "there's nothing here you could write off as true filler, but that perfect flow that made their masterpieces so thrilling is missing", but ended by calling it "a worthwhile throwback to the freak attitude that kicked off their career over a decade earlier." Matthew Perpetua of Pitchfork gave the album a rating of 7.2 out of 10 and called the album "evidence of true artistic growth", but noted that "[the] successes share space with creative cul-de-sacs and uninspired genre exercises". PopMatters' Evan Sawdey wrote that "though the Jaxx will continue to rack up left-field hits and critical acclaim for years to come, both Scars and Crazy Itch Radio show that the group's innovative streak has come to an end." He noted that "though they can still produce utterly awe-inspiring tracks now and then (could 'Raindrops' been created by anyone else but'' the Jaxx?), it appears that Basement Jaxx are struggling under the pressure to come up with another stone-cold masterpiece". In his Consumer Guide, Robert Christgau gave the album a two-star honorable mention and stated that it's "As good as their cameos as usual, led by Yo Majesty, Yoko, and Ms. Paloma Faith, who is clearly worthy of domestic consumption", while picking out two songs from the album, "Twerk" and "Day of the Sunflowers (We March On)".

Track listing

Chart performance

Release history

References 

XL Recordings albums
2009 albums
Basement Jaxx albums